Seah Kian Peng (born 1961) is a Singaporean politician who served as Deputy Speaker of the Parliament of Singapore between 2011 and 2016. A member of the governing People's Action Party (PAP), he has been the Member of Parliament (MP) representing the Braddell Heights division of Marine Parade GRC since 2006. He has also been serving as the chief executive officer of NTUC Fairprice since 2010 to 2022 .

Early life 
Seah was born into a family of six, consisting of his father, a line worker in a printing firm and his mother, a housewife who took on sewing gigs to supplement the family income, and himself, the third out of the four children. Seah studied at Raffles Institution before he received a Colombo Plan scholarship to study at the University of New South Wales.

Career

Early career 
Upon graduation with a first class honours degree in building, Seah returned to Singapore to complete his National Service, then worked in a government-linked company, Indeco Engineers, before joining the Singapore Civil Service. Seah was seconded to the National Trades Union Congress (NTUC) to do corporate planning and start NTUC Healthcare's chain of pharmacies. Seah then left NTUC for the corporate world between 1994 and 1996 to do corporate planning, as a "bucket list item". He returned to the public sector in 1996 to head NTUC Healthcare and NTUC Media successively, before being appointed as the chief operating officer of NTUC FairPrice in 2001, then as the chief executive officer of NTUC FairPrice in 2010.

Seah is active on the community front. He served as a director on Centre for Fathering Limited, a non-profit organisation that aims to get fathers more involved in the lives of their children, from 2004 to 2018. Seah has been an advisor to the Amalgamated Union of Public Daily Rated Workers as early as 2005.

Political career 
Seah was fielded as a People's Action Party (PAP) candidate for Marine Parade GRC in the 2006 general election, and was elected as Member of Parliament for Marine Parade GRC (Braddell Heights ward) in a walkover for the 11th Parliament. Seah was re-elected in Marine Parade Group GRC in the 2011 and 2015 general elections when the PAP team was challenged by the National Solidarity Party and Workers' Party respectively.

In Parliament, Seah served as Deputy Speaker from October 2011 to January 2016. On 10 March 2010, Vivian Balakrishnan, Minister for Community Development, Youth and Sports, suggested that Seah to work out a private member's bill to propose amendments to the Maintenance of Parents Act. After establishing a 10-person workgroup to look at the proposal, the bill was introduced on 18 October 2010 and was passed on 23 November 2010.

Seah was appointed as CEO of NTUC Fairprice from 2010 to 2022 and as chairperson of Social and Family Development Government Parliamentary Committee (GPC) in the 14th Parliament.

Personal life 
Seah is married to Jean Yap and they have two children.

References

External links 
 Seah Kian Peng on Parliament of Singapore
 Braddell Heights constituency website
 

Members of the Parliament of Singapore
People's Action Party politicians
Living people
1961 births
University of New South Wales alumni
Raffles Institution alumni